Here's That Raney Day is an album by jazz guitarist Jimmy Raney that was recorded in France in 1980 and released on the French label Ahead.

Track listing 
 "Chewish Chive and English" (Jimmy Raney) – 5:12
 "Back Home Again in Indiana" (Ballard MacDonald, James F. Hanley) – 4:40
 "Au Privave" (Charlie Parker) – 5:45
 "Scrapple from the Apple" (Parker) – 7:10
 "You Don't Know What Love Is" (Gene de Paul, Don Raye) – 7:34
 "All the Things You Are" (Jerome Kern, Oscar Hammerstein II) – 7:32
 "Chasin' the Bird"  (Parker) – 7:13
 "Back Home Again in Indiana" [take 2] (MacDonald, Hanley) – 5:35 Bonus track on CD reissue
 "Chewish Chive and English" [take 2] (Raney) – 4:32 Bonus track on CD reissue

Personnel 
Jimmy Raney – guitar
Hank Jones – piano
Pierre Michelot – bass
Jimmy Cobb – drums

References 

Jimmy Raney albums
1980 albums
Black & Blue Records albums